Polémica en el bar was an Argentine TV series, starred by Gerardo Sofovich.

Premise
Polémica en el bar features a number of comedians gathered in a bar, sitting in a round table. They discuss topics such as football, politics and show business, and start controversies around them.

Production
Polémica en el bar was first introduced in 1962, as a sketch of the comedy program Operación Ja-Ja. It starred Gerardo Sofovich, Juan Carlos Altavista, Jorge Porcel, Carlos Carella and Rodolfo Crespi, as people discussing modern issues at the table of a bar. Alberto Irízar played the owner of the bar, and Vicente La Russa the waiter. The program had a positive reception, and was a steady sketch of the program for several years.

The sketch was promoted to a standalone program in 1972, starred by Sofovich, Altavista, Porcel, Javier Portales, Adolfo García Grau and Fidel Pintos. Most episodes got nearly 60 rating points. The cast changed as years passed, and most of the new comedians were not as capable as the former ones, which led to a decline in rating and popular reception. The program aired until 2010, with the final line-up being Sofovich, Guillermo Marconi, René Bertrand, Sergio Gonal, Horacio Pagani and Guillermo Miguel.

Gerardo Sofovich died in 2015. His son, Gustavo Sofovich, made a reboot of the program the following year, also titled Polémica en el bar.

References

Televisión Pública original programming
Argentine comedy television series
1962 Argentine television series debuts
2010 Argentine television series endings